Arcadia is located in Baltimore County, Maryland, United States.

The population as of the 2000 census for zip code 21155, part of which covers Arcadia, was 2349.

The town of Arcadia has many attractions and events. Three such events are the Annual Arcadia Bluegrass Festival, the Arcadia Championship Demolition Derbies and the annual show held by the Maryland Steam Historical Society, Inc. which features steam engines, antique cars, tractor pulls, country music and a flea market, among other attractions.

Arcadia is a rural town. The post office is signed "Upperco". There is no police department, no mayor or any other town governance. There is one church (Lutheran), Arcadia Volunteer Fire Company, the carnival grounds and a railroad track that passes through it. In recent decades there was a small independent convenience store and a Chrysler dealership, neither of which exist today. It is adjacent to Maryland Route 30 between the much larger towns of Reistertown and Hampstead.

Notable persons from Arcadia
Major League Baseball pitcher Otis Stocksdale was born in Arcadia on August 7, 1871.

Arcadia in media
Arcadia, MD, became well known when it was chosen as the model for the fictional hometown, also called Arcadia, on the 2003–2005 CBS television series Joan of Arcadia.

References

External links
Washington Post article about Arcadia, Md.
Maryland Steam
Arcadia Volunteer Fire Company

Populated places in Baltimore County, Maryland